Gadda is a surname. Notable people with the surname include:

Carlo Emilio Gadda (1893–1973), Italian writer and poet
Massimo Gadda (born 1963), Italian football coach and former player

Italian-language surnames